Madonna and Child Enthroned with Two Male Saints is a 1489 oil on panel painting by Cima da Conegliano, previously owned by the church of San Dionisio in the Zermen district of Feltre and now in the Museo Civico in that town.

Identification
The cymatium at the top shows Jesus between Saint Peter and Saint Paul. The saints in the main panel Denis on the left and a martyr with a palm on the right, but it is not known for certain who the latter is - the museum itself identifies him as Victor, but the Fondazione Federico Zeri catalogue has him as Eleutherius.

References

1489 paintings
Paintings depicting Saint Peter
Paintings depicting Paul the Apostle
Paintings depicting Jesus
Paintings of saints
Paintings of the Madonna and Child by Cima da Conegliano
Paintings in Veneto